Dreamin' Wild is a 2022 American biographical drama film, written, directed, and produced by Bill Pohlad. It follows Donnie and Joe Emerson. It stars Casey Affleck, Walton Goggins, Zooey Deschanel, Noah Jupe, Jack Dylan Grazer, Chris Messina, and Beau Bridges.

The film had its world premiere at the 79th Venice International Film Festival on September 7, 2022.

Premise
“Dreamin’ Wild” tells the true story of the Emerson family and the tumult that followed the success of their self-recorded pop-funk album of the same name, which went largely unnoticed until critics rediscovered and reappraised it decades later. Now, as an adult, Donnie is forced to confront the ghosts from the past and grapple with the emotional toll his dreams have taken on the family who supported him.

Cast
 Casey Affleck as Donnie Emerson
Noah Jupe as young Donnie
 Walton Goggins as Joe Emerson
Jack Dylan Grazer as young Joe
 Zooey Deschanel as Nancy
 Chris Messina as Matt Sullivan
 Beau Bridges as Don Sr.

Production
In April 2019, it was announced Bill Pohlad would direct, write, and produce a biographical film revolving around Donnie and Joe Emerson, with Focus Features set to distribute. In October 2021, Casey Affleck, Noah Jupe, Zooey Deschanel, Chris Messina, Jack Dylan Grazer and Walton Goggins joined the cast of the film.

Principal photography began in October 2021, in Spokane, Washington.

Release
The film had its world premiere at the 79th Venice International Film Festival on September 7, 2022.

References

External links
 

2022 biographical drama films
American biographical drama films
Biographical films about musicians
Biographical films about singers
Films directed by Bill Pohlad
2020s American films
2020s English-language films